"Detroit City" is a song written by Danny Dill and Mel Tillis, made famous by Billy Grammer (as "I Wanna Go Home"), country music singer Bobby Bare and Tom Jones. Bare's version was released in 1963. The song — sometimes known as "I Wanna Go Home" (from the opening line to the refrain) — was Bare's first Top 10 hit on the Billboard Hot Country Singles chart that summer, and became a country music standard.

About the song
Prior to Bare's success with "Detroit City," country singer Billy Grammer released his version of the Danny Dill-Mel Tillis penned song. His version was known as "I Wanna Go Home" and peaked at #18 on the Billboard country charts in 1963.

The song is the working man's complaint, and "with its melody reminiscent of the 'Sloop John B,' describes the alienation felt by many rural southerners in the mid North," wrote country music historian Bill Malone. "Here, [Bare's] earnest and plaintive interpretation lends great believability to this mournful song." Bob Dylan describes the song as "...not so much the song of a dreamer, but the song of someone who is caught up in a fantasy of the way things used to be. But the listener knows that it just doesn't exist." Bare's version begins in the key of E, until after the repeat of the refrain, he makes a transition to the key of B for the second verse and refrain.  He makes a transition back to the key of E as the song fades out. Bare's version also features a spoken recitation following half of the second verse, before singing the refrain before the song's fade.

The song's peak in popularity during the summer of 1963 came during a time when Tillis was still experiencing most of his success as a songwriter. He had previously written hits for Webb Pierce, Brenda Lee, Stonewall Jackson, and others, but this was one of his earliest major hits as a songwriter outside of those artists.

The song won Bobby Bare a Grammy for the Best Country & Western Recording in 1963.

Chart performance
Grammer's "I Wanna Go Home" reached #18 on the Billboard Hot Country Singles chart in early 1963. That summer, Bare's re-titled version peaked at #6 on the Billboard country chart (it spent total of 18 weeks on this chart) and #16 on the Billboard Hot 100.

Billy Grammer

Bobby Bare

Tom Jones

Dean Martin

Other Covers
Jan & Dean covered the song for their 1963 album Surf City And Other Swingin' Cities.
Arthur Alexander released the song as a single in 1965 backed with "You Don't Care," but it did not perform well and proved to be his last single for Dot Records.  Nonetheless, historian Nat Hentoff described Alexander's rendition as "deeply compelling," stating that it "[eclipsed] the original version by Bobby Bare."  Alexander biographer described it as "a stirring rendition."  Music USA: A Rough Guide also praised Alexander's version. No Depression magazine states that Alexander's version "mourns a rural-to-urban migration that black Americans could relate to every bit as much as poor Southern whites."
Jerry Lee Lewis released a version on his 1965 album Country Songs for City Folks.
The Jordanaires released a cover on their 1966 album The Big Country Hits. 
Charley Pride released his cover of the song as the b-side of his 1966 hit "Just Between You and Me". Both songs were later included on the 1967 album Pride of Country Music.
In 1967, the song was also covered by Tom Jones, who had a UK Top 10 hit with it. The Jones version features Bare's spoken Recitation as well. Jones also included the song on his 1967 album Green, Green Grass of Home.
Solomon Burke covered the song in 1967 as well. His version reached #10 in the Canadian RPM Soul charts, January 27,  1968.
Dolly Parton covered the song on her 1980 album 9 to 5 and Odd Jobs.
The song has also been covered by soul singer Joe Tex.
The song was covered by Yugoslav beat band Tomi Sovilj i Njegove Siluete on their 1967 EP Stoj, Džoni (Stop, Johnny).

References

1963 singles
1967 singles
Appalachian culture in Michigan
Songs written by Danny Dill
Songs written by Mel Tillis
Bobby Bare songs
Jan and Dean songs
Billy Grammer songs
Jerry Lee Lewis songs
Tom Jones (singer) songs
Dean Martin songs
Songs about Detroit
1963 songs
Decca Records singles
RCA Records singles
Arthur Alexander songs
Dot Records singles
Song recordings produced by Peter Sullivan (record producer)